The Journal of Biomedical Materials Research is a peer-reviewed scientific journals of biomedical material science. It was established in 1967. In 1974, it absorbed Biomedical Materials Symposium (1971–1974). In 1990, it absorbed the journal Journal of Applied Biomaterials (1990–1995). In 2002, it split into two parts, Journal of Biomedical Materials Research Part A, and Journal of Biomedical Materials Research Part B. The two parts are published by John Wiley & Sons.

Part A

Journal of Biomedical Materials Research Part A was established in 2003. It is edited by James M. Anderson.

Abstracting and indexing
Part A is indexed and abstracted in the following bibliographic databases:

According to the Journal Citation Reports, the journal has a 2020 impact factor of 4.396, ranking it 25th out of 90 in the category 'Engineering, Biomedical' and 18th out of 41 in the category 'Materials Science, Biomaterials.

Part B

The Journal of Biomedical Materials Research Part B: Applied Biomaterials covers design, development, production, and application of biomaterials and medical devices. Publishing formats are original research papers, short reports, reviews, current concepts, special reports, and editorials. It is an official journal of the Society for Biomaterials, the Japanese Society for Biomaterials, the Australasian Society for Biomaterials, and the Korean Society for Biomaterials. The editor-in-chief is Jeremy L. Gilbert (Syracuse University).

Abstracting and indexing 
Part B is indexed and abstracted in the following bibliographic databases:

According to the Journal Citation Reports, the journal has a 2020 impact factor of 3.368, ranking it 43rd out of 90 in the category 'Engineering, Biomedical' and 27th out of 41 in the category 'Materials Science, Biomaterials.

References

External links 
 Part A
 Part B

Materials science journals
Biomedical engineering journals
Publications established in 2003
Wiley (publisher) academic journals
English-language journals